Micropterix tuscaniensis is a species of moth belonging to the family Micropterigidae. It was described by John Heath in 1960. It is only known from central and southern Italy, where it has been found in the provinces of Tuscany, Calabria, Apulia and Basilicata. However, it is probably distributed throughout the whole of mainland Italy, except for the Alps.

Adults have been found at the edge of dense shrub- and woodland at rocky slopes in full sunshine. There, the adults rest underneath the leaves of beech, where they were crawling and probably feeding on pollen, gathered on the surface of the young, somewhat sticky leaves. Adults are on the wing from late April to early July, depending on the altitude.

References

Micropterigidae
Moths described in 1960
Moths of Europe
Endemic fauna of Italy
Taxa named by John Heath